is a Japanese professional wrestling promotion based in Shinjuku, Tokyo. Its name stands for Dramatic Dream Team, which was the promotion's official name from 1997 to 2004. Founded in March 1997 by Shintaro Muto, the promotion was eventually bought and managed by Shoichi Ichimiya until December 2005, when Sanshiro Takagi took over as the new president. In 2017, DDT was sold to CyberAgent. Takagi retained his position, while Takahiro Yamauchi took over as the new DDT director.

DDT became one of the top promotions in Japanese independent wrestling by creating a unique sports entertainment style, often parodying WWE, with a Japanese puroresu flair to the matches. DDT has had agreements with various MMA and professional wrestling promotions around the world. DDT's biggest event is Peter Pan, held each year since 2009.

The cards' matches tend to be a mixture of Japanese lucharesu (a mix of lucha libre and traditional puroresu), worked shoot-style, hardcore brawling and comedy matches. DDT is in many ways a parody of American pro wrestling, particularly WWE, using over-the-top gimmicks (most notably Danshoku Dino) as well as unique match types including hardcore matches in a campsite (which featured use of bottle rockets as weapons), an "Office Deathmatch" (where the ring was set up to resemble a section of an office building, complete with cubicle walls and computers), and a "Silence Match" (where wrestlers were forbidden to make loud noises, resulting in slow-motion chops and punches and featuring the commentary team speaking in a faux-whisper).

In January 2020, DDT's parent company CyberAgent purchased Pro Wrestling Noah, with DDT's executives taking over Noah's operations and Noah's content appearing on DDT's streaming service Wrestle Universe.

History

Dramatic Dream Team (1997–2004)

The promotion was founded by Shintaro Muto, Sanshiro Takagi, Kyohei Mikami and Kazushige Nosawa, after they left Pro Wrestling Crusaders. The promotion was named Dramatic Dream Team, its first event took place on January 31, 1997, in Tokyo. In 1999, DDT started producing pay-per-view digests of its product on DirectTV.

The promotion then established their own governing body in 2000, the King of DDT, shortened as KO-D, creating the KO-D Openweight Championship, Ironman Heavymetalweight Championship and the KO-D Tag Team Championship. DDT also created their own tag team tournament the DDT Tag League. Later in 2003, Shoichi Ichimiya became the new president of DDT.

Independent DDT Pro-Wrestling (2004–2017)

On 2004, DDT rebranded to DDT Pro-Wrestling yūgen gaisha renaming the promotion to DDT Pro-Wrestling. In October, DDT got a timeslot on Fighting TV Samurai, creating their regular broadcast program DDT Dramatic Fantasia. In 2005, indie promotion Union Pro Wrestling was revived by DDT.

On December 28, 2005 Ichimiya retired from professional wrestling and announced his departure from DDT. This led to Sanshiro Takagi taking over the promotion as the new president. Then the company focused on the feud between the face stable Italian Four Horsemen and the heel stable Disaster Box. In November 2006, DDT announced the creation of their fourth active title the DDT Extreme Championship. Later in 2007 DDT announced a working relationship with Dragon Gate. DDT and Dragon Gate held their first co-promoted show, Dramatic Dream Gate on April 18, 2007 in Shinjuku Face in Tokyo, Japan. DDT would later become a member of the Global Professional Wrestling Alliance. The group was established as a means to aid the many competing wrestling promotions in Japan. In 2009, DDT announced that they were going to become a stock company, turning their company from private to public. In March 2010, DDT announced a working relationship with Big Japan Pro Wrestling. Later in March, Takagi announced the DDT48 (later renamed Dramatic Sōsenkyo), which was a fan vote where the winner received a shot at the KO-D Openweight Championship. Later that month, in storyline, Michael Nakazawa stepped down as the CEO of DDT and Amon Tsurumi became the General Manager of the promotion. In 2011, DDT received the Fighting TV Samurai Indie no Oshigoto prize for having the best show the year, winning the Best Show Award for Judgement 2011.

In March 2012, the Dramatic Fantasia weekly program was briefly cancelled by Samurai TV. This led to the launch of the program DDT Wrestling Hour on Niconico, starting April 2. On June 4, DDT launched another sub-brand named Tokyo Joshi Pro-Wrestling (TJPW), which was exclusive to women's wrestlers. DDT celebrated its 15th anniversary on August 18, 2012, by holding its first ever event in Nippon Budokan. On December 23, 2012, DDT announced the creation of their fifth active title, the KO-D 6-Man Tag Team Championship. On January 17, 2013, DDT announced that Daisuke Sasaki had signed a contract to officially make DDT his home promotion, ending his days as a freelancer. On April 17 DDT formed another sub-brand Ganbare☆Pro-Wrestling (GanPro). On May 3, DDT's Max Bump event was broadcast live by Samurai TV. After that DDT launched a weekly program DDT's Pro-Wrestling Banzai ＼(^o^)／, which was also broadcast by Samurai TV. On November 28, DDT announced a new project named DDT New Attitude (DNA) which would be another sub-brand of DDT, functioning as a developmental brand for DDT.

On January 14, 2015, DDT opened a women's wrestling school with Makoto Oishi and Cherry as instructors. Later DDT announced the creation of their sixth active title, the King of Dark Championship, which would be "won" by the loser of a dark match. On June 23, DDT opened the Dropkick Bar which is a professional wrestling, boxing and mixed martial arts-themed sports bar. Professional wrestling personalities regularly make appearances at the bar. On August 17 it was announced that Union Pro would be folding after its 10th anniversary event on October 4. Three days after its folding, Union was replaced by a new promotion named Pro-Wrestling Basara, which launched in January 2016. In October 2016, DDT announced "DDT Universe", a new streaming service for events held by DDT, DNA, Basara, TJPW and GanPro. The service launched on January 23, 2017. On April 30, 2017, announced the creation of their seventh active title, the KO-D 10-Man Tag Team Championship, meant for teams of five wrestlers, the title is believed to be the first of its kind in professional wrestling. with the inaugural champions crowned on August 20, 2017.

On July 5, 2017, it was announced that DDT had entered into a partnership with Canada's Canadian Wrestling's Elite promotion. On August 20 Danshoku Dino defeated Sanshiro Takagi in a match, where if Dino won he would become the Producer of DDT. After Dino won he fired the DDT's General Manager Amon Tsurumi and Turumi returned to a backstage role as assistant producer and reverted to his real name Hisaya Imabayashi. Dino also announced the creation of a new tournament called "D-Oh Grand Prix".

DDT under CyberAgent (2017–present)
On September 1, 2017, 100% of DDT's shares were sold to the CyberAgent company. Sanshiro Takagi remained as the DDT president, while CyberAgent director Takahiro Yamauchi took over as the new DDT director.

On June 11, 2019, DDT announced Basara would be splitting up from DDT and become an independent company starting January 1, 2020. In October, the third edition of the annual "Iron Fist Tag Tournament" led to the creation of Basara's first tag team championship, the Iron Fist Tag Team Championship.

On January 28, 2020, DDT's parent company CyberAgent purchased Pro Wrestling Noah. DDT's President Sanshiro Takagi was named the President of Pro Wrestling Noah and Naomichi Marufuji the Vice President. Noah's events began airing on DDT's streaming service DDT Universe starting with Noah's Global Jr. League 2020 on January 30. On July 27, 2020, it was announced Noah and DDT would merge in a new company, CyberFight.

On March 20, 2022, at Judgement, it was announced that All Elite Wrestling (AEW) had formed a working relationship with DDT and TJPW that would see wrestlers from both brands appear on AEW programming.

Personnel

Championships

Current championships

Former, inactive and defunct championships
DDT has had a lot of different championships, some of which were very short-lived.

Events

Marquee events
 Peter Pan
 Judgement
 Ultimate Party
 Into The Fight
 Max Bump
 God Bless DDT
 Who's Gonna Top?
 Never Mind
 Sweet Dream

Tournaments

Active

Inactive

Accomplishments

Dropkick Bar
Dropkick Bar is a professional wrestling, boxing and mixed martial arts-themed sports bar owned and operated by DDT in Shinjuku. Professional wrestling personalities make appearances at the bar.

Broadcasters 
Domestic:
 Fighting TV Samurai (2004–present, currently broadcasting live specials, retrospective shows and magazine show DDT Pro Wrestling Banzai)
 AbemaTV (2017–present, online linear television service, live-streaming episodes of DDT Pro Wrestling Banzai)
 Nico Nico Douga (2012–present, currently broadcasting live specials, DDT Wrestling Hour streaming untelevised spot-shows and interviews)
Worldwide:
 Wrestle Universe (streaming service, broadcasting most DDT shows live, as well as on-demand classic, as well as content from other promotions, beginning with DDT sister promotions Pro Wrestling Noah, Ganbare☆Pro-Wrestlng and Tokyo Joshi Pro-Wrestling)
 FITE TV (2020–present, streaming service, broadcasting most DDT big shows live, as well as on-demand classic)

See also
Kemono Michi
Professional wrestling in Japan
List of professional wrestling promotions in Japan

References

External links

DDT Universe
Dramatic Dream Team (Japan) - Title history of all major DDT championships

 
1997 establishments in Japan
CyberAgent
Entertainment companies established in 1997
Japanese professional wrestling promotions
Shinjuku